Gowdu (also Romanized as Gowdū) is a village in Qaleh Qazi Rural District, Qaleh Qazi District, Bandar Abbas County, Hormozgan Province, Iran. At the 2006 census, its population was 423, in 99 families.

References 

Populated places in Bandar Abbas County